The 1140s was a decade of the Julian Calendar which began on January 1, 1140, and ended on December 31, 1149.

Significant people
 Al-Muqtafi
 Pope Celestine II
 Pope Lucius II
 Pope Eugene III
 Al-Hafiz

References